Kaliningrad State Technical University (abbreviated KSTU) is a technical university at Victory Square in Kaliningrad, Russia. It is located in the former combined Amtsgericht and Landgericht building of Königsberg, Germany.

Having been founded on the basis of Moscow Technical Institute for the Fishery Industry, KSTU is justly considered as the beginning of Russian higher fishery education and a range of scientific schools in navigation, commercial fishery, and progressive technologies of food production. At present, it develops as a multi-disciplinary institution considering the demands and the economic potential of the Region, maintaining traditions of high-quality specialist training for the fishery industry.

Students are trained in 42 higher educational courses at various levels, namely, Bachelor, Professional Diploma, Master, Doctor of Philosophy (Kandidat Nauk) and Doctor of Science (Doktor Nauk) Degrees; professionals are offered various upgrading courses.600 teachers and researchers, including 75 professors holding the Doktor Nauk Degree, 80 academicians and corresponding members of international and public Russian Academies of Science form the faculty if the university. 28 scientists are awarded titles of honoured workers of science, Russian higher education, branches of science, and the fishery industry.

Scientific research is traditionally undertaken in many areas being the most important for the modern navigation, fisheries and seafood processing, power engineering, construction, production automation and control, information technology, natural science, nano-technology, etc. The university founded effectively working schools in ichthyology, commercial fishery, shipbuilding and repair, automation of production and control, technique and technology of raw materials processing. There are 12 research laboratories and scientific centres, four of them being of the applied character. Four dissertation councils work at the university.

Recently, intensification of scientific work has involved the university into 25 federal scientific programmes, as well as in TEMPUS and TACIS projects. Regional representatives of public professional Academies of Science applied Centre for new Information Technologies, Research Institute for Maritime Engineering Service, Institute of Ecology and Sustainable Development successfully operate on the university basis.

International co-operation of the university with foreign educational and research organizations is constantly expanding, with the Baltic Sea region in particular.

Research

Research at the university is undertaken in applied subjects, including: Water Bioresources and Aquaculture,
Fisheries,
Automation and Machine Building,
Biochemistry,
Biology,
Ecology,
Power Engineering,
Shipbuilding,
Computer Technologies,
Economics and Management,
Fish and Food Processing Technology,
Linguistics,
Mathematics,
Physics.
Most of the university's research is focused in biological resources of the world's oceans, the Baltic Sea area and inland waters, aquaculture, new technologies for fish processing and food production, development of information science, computer applications and technologies, research into the rational use of traditional and non-traditional power resources, problems of shipbuilding, civil engineering and architecture, ecology, life safety, laser technology, and micro- and nanotechnology.

Faculties

Faculty of Bioresources and Naturals Usage
Commercial Fisheries Faculty
Mechanics and Technology Faculty
Naval and Power Engineering Faculty
Automatic Production and Control Faculty
Economics Faculty
Humanities Faculty
Fundamental Training Faculty
Upgrading Faculty
Fundamental Training Division for Foreign Students

Museums

The university has a museum of history and art with a large number of exhibits. Some of them date back to the beginning of the 20th century. Special-topic exhibitions are held regularly. There are also two unique specialized museums: the Ichthyology Museum and the Hydrobiology one. The exhibits of these present the fauna of the World Ocean

References

Universities in Kaliningrad Oblast
Universities and institutes established in the Soviet Union
Buildings and structures in Kaliningrad
Technical universities and colleges in Russia